Loch Fithie is a small, lowland freshwater loch lying approximately  east of Forfar, Scotland.

Survey
The loch was surveyed on 30 June 1903 by Sir John Murray and later charted  as part of Murray's Bathymetrical Survey of Fresh-Water Lochs of Scotland 1897-1909.

History
To the northwest of the loch are the remains of the Augustinian Restenneth Priory. In 1954, a stone axe head was found during excavations of a gravel ridge at the loch.

References

Fithie
Fithie